Many artists have released video and audio records of their live performance at the Hollywood Bowl, an amphitheater in Los Angeles:

 The Beatles at the Hollywood Bowl, a 1977 live album by the Beatles, recorded in 1964 and 1965, re-released in 2016 as Live at the Hollywood Bowl
 Monty Python Live at the Hollywood Bowl, a 1982 concert film by the Monty Python team
 Live at the Hollywood Bowl (The Doors album), a live album released in 1987 from The Doors performance on July 5, 1968
 Mario Lanza Live at Hollywood Bowl: Historical Recordings (1947 & 1951), a 2000 CD that includes the six selections that tenor Mario Lanza sang at his first Hollywood Bowl concert in August, 1947
 Live at the Hollywood Bowl (Ben Harper film), a DVD documenting a live performance by Ben Harper & the Innocent Criminals on August 4, 2003
 Morrissey: Live at the Hollywood Bowl, a DVD documenting a live performance by Morrissey on June 8th, 2007
 Astral Weeks Live at the Hollywood Bowl, a 2009 CD from two concert performances by Van Morrison on November 7 & 8, 2008
 Astral Weeks Live at the Hollywood Bowl: The Concert Film, a 2009 DVD release of the same concert performance
 An Evening of Magic, Live at the Hollywood Bowl by Chuck Mangione
 Live at the Hollywood Bowl (Dave Matthews Band album), 2019
Amidst the Chaos: Live from the Hollywood Bowl by Sara Bareilles, 2021